Sefidebrahim (also Romanized as Sefīdebrāhīm) is a village in Gughar Rural District, in the Central District of Baft County, Kerman Province, Iran. At the 2006 census, its population was 41, in 14 families.

References 

Populated places in Baft County